The 69th Festival del film Locarno was held 3–13 August 2016 in Locarno, Switzerland.

The line-up consisted of ten sections:
 Piazza Grande (16 films)
 International Competition (17 films)
 Filmmakers of the Present (15 films)
 Leopards of Tomorrow (40 films)
 Signs of Life (8 films)
 Out of Competition (19 films)
 Histoire(s) du cinéma (30 films)
 Retrospective (73 films)
 Open Doors (21 films)
 Jury Films (16 films)
Carlo Chatrian was the festival’s Artistic Director. The primary Selection Committee included Mark Peranson (Head of Programming), Lorenzo Esposito, Sergio Fant, and Aurélie Godet. The Leopards of Tomorrow section was programmed by Alessandro Marcionni (Head), Gonzalo De Pedro Amatria, Liz Harkman, and Bruno Quiblier. The Retrospective program was curated by Olaf Möller and Roberto Turigliatto.

Sections

Piazza Grande

International Competition (Concorso internazionale)

Filmmakers of the Present (Concorso Cineasti del presente) 
Filmmakers of the Present is the festival's competition for first or second feature films.

Leopards of Tomorrow (Pardi di domani) 
Leopards of Tomorrow is the festival's competitive program for short films, with separate international and Swiss sections.

International Competition (Concorso internazionale)

Swiss Competition (Concorso nazionale)

Signs of Life

Out of Competition (Fuori concorso)

Feature-length

Shorts

Histoire(s) du cinéma

Retrospective (Retrospettiva) 
The 2016 retrospective section, Beloved and Rejected: Cinema in the young Federal Republic of Germany from 1949 to 1963, was centered around filmmaking in early West Germany.

Open Doors 
Beginning in 2016, the Open Doors screening and development section initiated a three-year focus on eight South Asian countries: Afghanistan, Bangladesh, Bhutan, Maldives, Myanmar, Nepal, Pakistan and Sri Lanka.

Feature-length

Shorts

Jury films
The festival presents films associated with jurors for the various competitive sections.

References

Locarno Festival
2016 film festivals
2016 festivals in Europe
2016 in Switzerland
August  2016 events in Switzerland